The 2018 Canadian Championship was a soccer tournament hosted and organized by the Canadian Soccer Association. It was the eleventh edition of the annual Canadian Championship. Toronto FC won the competition for the third consecutive year and qualified for the 2019 CONCACAF Champions League.

The 2018 edition saw the invitation of the champions of League1 Ontario (L1O) and Première Ligue de soccer du Québec (PLSQ). FC Edmonton suspended operations and did not take part in the Championship this year. As a result, a new format was adopted which saw the L1O and PLSQ champions, the Oakville Blue Devils and A.S. Blainville, enter in a new first qualifying round. As winners of the first qualifying round, AS Blainville played Ottawa Fury FC in the second qualifying round, and the winner of that match, Ottawa Fury, joined the MLS teams in the semi-final round. With six teams, the 2018 edition was the largest edition of the championship to date.

Qualified clubs 

Statistics include previous incarnations of the Montreal Impact and Vancouver Whitecaps.

Tournament bracket

Matches

First qualifying round 

A.S. Blainville won 3–1 on aggregate.

Second qualifying round

Ottawa Fury FC won 2–0 on aggregate.

Semifinals

Toronto FC won 4–0 on aggregate.

Vancouver Whitecaps FC won 2–1 on aggregate.

Final

Toronto FC won 7–4 on aggregate.

Goalscorers

References 

2018
2018 in Canadian soccer
2018 domestic association football cups